The 2017 Australian V8 Touring Car Series (commercially known as the 2017 Kumho Tyres Australian V8 Touring Car Series) was the tenth running of the Australian V8 Touring Car Series, the third tier of Australian touring car racing. The five-round, fifteen-race championship began on 21 April at Phillip Island Grand Prix Circuit and concluded on 29 October at Sydney Motorsport Park.

Entries

Calendar and results

Overview

Championship standings

References

External links
 

Australian V8 Touring Car Series
V8 Touring Car Series